Mycielski is a Polish surname. Notable people with the surname include:

Jan Mycielski (born 1932), Polish-American mathematician
The Mycielskian, a construction in graph theory
The Grötzsch graph, sometimes called the Mycielski graph or the Mycielski-Grötzsch graph
Ludwik Mycielski (1854-1926), Polish politician
Zygmunt Mycielski (1907-1987), Polish composer and music critic

See also
Dołęga-Mycielski, Polish noble family

Polish-language surnames